The Tinia Valles are a set of channels in an ancient valley in the Memnonia quadrangle of Mars, located at 4.7° south latitude and 149° west longitude.  They are 18.7 km long and were named after a classical river in Italy. The associated valley has many dark slope streaks on its walls. These features are widely believed to be avalanches of a thin layer of bright dust that usually covers the dark surface beneath.

References 

Memnonia quadrangle
Valleys and canyons on Mars